C T Holdings PLC, formerly known as Ceylon Theatres Limited, is one of the largest conglomerate companies in Sri Lanka. The company is incorporated in 1928 by Chittampalam A. Gardiner and quoted on the Colombo Stock Exchange ever since. In 2019, Brand Finance ranked C T Holdings eighth amongst the most valuable conglomerates in Sri Lanka with a brand value of LKR18,981 million. C T Holdings also ranked eighth in the LMD 100, a list of leading listed companies in Sri Lanka by the business magazine, LMD.

History

Ceylon Theatres Limited was founded by Chittampalam A. Gardiner and Alfred Thambiayah in 1928. It is the first Ceylonese company to enter the film screening business. Four years later the company was floated. The Regal Cinema in Colombo and another in Nuwara Eliya made up the assets of the company. By 1950, Ceylon Theatres was the largest film circuit in the country. The company controlled 69 permanent cinemas of which 14 were located in Colombo.

In 1981, under the leadership of Albert A. Page, the company acquired Millers and Cargills venturing into retailing and distribution. In 1991 the company build the Majestic City shopping complex and cineplex. When the Government of Sri Lanka divested its stake in Lanka Ceramics Limited, Ceylon Theatres acquired 65% of the shares. Empire Residencies, a 37 and 33-storeyed residential apartment twin-tower completed in 2009. In 2010, the company name was changed from Ceylon Theatres to C T Holdings. Kotmale Holdings, a dairy products manufacturing company is acquired in 2011. The company acquired a license to operate a commercial bank, and Cargills Bank was launched in 2014. In the same year, Cargills Square was established in Jaffna. In 2015, Empire Cineplex was established in Arcade Independence Square.

Operations
The company operates cinemas such as Regal Colombo, Empire, and Majestic cinemas. The company has been described as one of the most traditionally managed family-held businesses in the country. C T Holdings operates KFC and TGI Fridays franchises in Sri Lanka. C T Holdings entered into a partnership with BookMyShow, an India-based online ticketing platform. The partnership allowed access to the Vista ERP system, a customisable ERP System. C T Holdings announced a share repurchase plan in 2020. In the board of directors' view, the share price then did not reflect the growth prospects of the company, therefore, conducive repurchase shares. Millers, a subsidiary of C T Holdings gained control of the Bandarawela Hotel in 2022.

See also
 List of companies listed on the Colombo Stock Exchange
 List of Sri Lankan public corporations by market capitalisation

References

External links
 C T Holdings PLC profile on Colombo Stock Exchange

1928 establishments in Ceylon
Companies listed on the Colombo Stock Exchange
Conglomerate companies of Sri Lanka
Entertainment companies established in 1928
Holding companies established in 1928
Holding companies of Sri Lanka